Port Hardy is a district municipality in British Columbia, Canada located on the north-east end of Vancouver Island. Port Hardy has a population of 4,132 as of the last census (2016).

It is the gateway to Cape Scott Provincial Park, the North Coast Trail and the BC Marine Trail, located on the northernmost tip of Vancouver Island.  The community has access to various outdoor activities, such as kayaking, caving, scuba diving, nature viewing, surfing, saltwater rapids, fishing and camping.

Port Hardy's twin city is Numata, Japan.

Name
Port Hardy was named after Vice-Admiral Sir Thomas Masterman Hardy, who served as the captain of HMS Victory. He served at the Battle of Trafalgar when Horatio Nelson died in his arms.

Demographics 

Religion 
According to the 2021 census, religious groups in Port Hardy included:
Irreligion (2,715 persons or 70.3%)
Christianity (995 persons or 25.8%)
Sikhism (40 persons or 1.0%)
Buddhism (25 persons or 0.6%)
Judaism (15 persons or 0.4%)
Islam (15 persons or 0.4%)
Indigenous Spirituality (10 persons or 0.3%)
Other (40 persons or 1.0%)

Filomi Days
Once a year, Port Hardy holds a celebration in Rotary Park to acknowledge its natural resource based economy. The three syllables, fi, lo and mi, stand for "fishing, logging and mining".
The celebration includes festivities in the park such as activities for children, fundraising concessions, entertainment, beer gardens, bake sales, craft sales, and fireworks.
A dance for each age group and a parade are also held on Filomi Days weekend- typically the third weekend in July.  Brookes Laidlaw represents the current Vice Admiral in the annual parade.

Tourism

Port Hardy's economy relies greatly on tourism. Ferries to Prince Rupert, another popular tourist destination in British Columbia, depart every other day during peak season.

Tourist traffic in the summer is immense, and hotels and restaurants usually find themselves with no room to accommodate all travellers.

Wildlife

Deer, black bears, bald eagles, squirrels, seals, salmon and many other species of birds and mammals are often spotted along the Quatse Loop Nature Trail or at Storey's Beach which is a short drive from town. Humpback whales can occasionally been seen surfacing in the bay. Port Hardy has many wildlife charters, fishing charters and places to camp during tourist season.

Climate
Port Hardy has an oceanic climate (Köppen Cfb) due to its proximity to the Pacific moderating influence. As a result, summers are very cool for the latitude, whereas winters instead are very mild. Although there is a strong drying trend in summer, its summer rainfall is still higher than those of the southerly mediterranean climates. Winter rainfall is very high and in general Port Hardy is far wetter than Canada's interior.

Radio
CFNI - 1240 Coast AM

Transportation 
Port Hardy is served by Port Hardy Airport and the Bear Cove Ferry Terminal. There are two taxi companies and a public transport bus.

Sister-city relations
  Numata, Gunma, Japan since September 1994

Gallery

See also

Tlatlasikwala Nation
Da'naxda'xw Awaetlatla Nation (Tanakteuk First Nation)
Kwakiutl First Nation (Fort Rupert Band)
Hardy Island Marine Provincial Park
Penrose Island Marine Provincial Park

References

External links 

Populated places on the British Columbia Coast
District municipalities in British Columbia
Northern Vancouver Island
Populated places in the Regional District of Mount Waddington